Craig Breen (born 2 February 1990) is an Irish rally driver, who competes part time in the Hyundai team in the WRC (World Rally Championship). He was the 2012 WRC Super 2000 world rally champion, scoring class wins in the Monte Carlo Rally, Wales Rally GB, Rally France and the Rally of Spain. Breen was also the WRC Academy champion in 2011, winning his first event at the 2011 Rallye Deutschland and sealing the championship with a win at Wales Rally GB. The Academy title going down to the last stage, with Breen and Estonian rally driver Egon Kaur ending the season, both on 111 points, Breen then won the title on count back of stage wins, 39 to 14. Breen recently won the Rentokil Historic Rally in Killarney, Kerry, Ireland in his BMW M3 E30.

Career

Craig is the son of Ray Breen, a national champion in Irish rallying. He began karting in 1999 in Ireland. He began rallying in 2007, combining it with karting commitments in Europe in 2008.

In 2009 he made the full-time switch to rallying, competing in the Irish, British and International Fiesta Sporting Trophys, winning all three championships. He also went on to win the Fiesta Sport Trophy International Shootout and was award a twelve month contract with M-Sport. For his achievements Breen was crowned Young Irish Rally Driver of the Year and received the Billy Coleman Award.

In 2010 he debuted the Ford Fiesta S2000 in both British Rally Championship and the Irish Tarmac Rally Championship. He took his first BRC victory on the 2010 Ulster Rally and went on to finish 2nd overall in the ITC. He also finished 17th overall in the car at the 2010 Rally Finland and 12th overall at Wales Rally GB.

In 2011, Breen competed in the WRC Academy driving a Ford Fiesta R2. He won his first WRC event at the Rallye Deutschland and his win at Wales Rally GB made him the inaugural WRC Academy Cup champion.

For 2012, Breen has progressed to the S-WRC championship driving a Ford Fiesta S2000. He won the opening round at Monte Carlo and is leading the championship after the second round on Sweden.

In June 2012, Breen's co-driver Gareth Roberts was killed in an accident during the Targa Florio Rally, the fifth round of the 2012 Intercontinental Rally Challenge.
In Rally de Catalunya, in November, he won the Super 2000 world championship. At the end of the rally, a very emotional Breen declared "I'm a kid, I can't believe I've done this."

In 2013, Breen and co-driver Paul Nagle was signed by Peugeot to lead their ERC campaign called 'Peugeot Rally Academy'. Breen was successful, achieving five podium places during the season, and eventually finishing 3rd overall, missing out on the runner-up spot by only four points. Midway during the season Nagle left the team to help out Volkswagen's Andreas Mikkelsen in the WRC; from the Rajd Polski onwards, Belgian Lara Vanneste became Breen's co-driver. They're expected to return to the team for the 2014 ERC season.

Breen and co-driver Scott Martin won the 2015 Circuit of Ireland Rally which has been a long-time ambition of Craig's especially as this would be the 20th anniversary of his Rally Idol's Tarmac Championship Win, that being the Late and Great Frank Meagher.

Breen achieved his maiden Special Stage win in the 2016 Rally Finland.

He did a part-time campaign with the Citroën Total World Rally Team in 2016, achieving an emotional first podium finish with third place in Finland. He improved the result in 2018 by finishing second in Sweden.

In October 2021, it was announced that Breen will join M-Sport World Rally Team as their lead driver for the 2022 season. He will join Adrien Fourmaux and Gus Greensmith in competing all 13 rounds.

Breens latest win was in the Killarney Historics rally on November 27th, 2021.

Before 2022 rally spain James Fulton is set to become breen's new co-driver after current co-driver Paul nagle announced his retirement. Paul nagle retires after rally spain. James Fulton will be the new co-driver of craig breen from last round of 2022 (rally Japan) onwards.

Career results
Breen won his first ERC rally at the 2014 Acropolis Rally in Greece, driving a Peugeot 208 T16.

WRC results 

* Season still in progress.

SWRC results

WRC Academy Results

WRC-2 results

IRC results

ERC results

* Season still in progress.

References

External links

Living people
1990 births
Irish rally drivers
Intercontinental Rally Challenge drivers
World Rally Championship drivers
FIA Institute Young Driver Excellence Academy drivers
European Rally Championship drivers
Sportspeople from Waterford (city)
Citroën Racing drivers
Peugeot Sport drivers
Saintéloc Racing drivers
Hyundai Motorsport drivers
M-Sport drivers